Vee is a village in Põhja-Pärnumaa Parish, Pärnu County in southwestern Estonia.

References

 

Villages in Pärnu County